Denis Švec (born 16 March 1996) is a Slovak football defender who currently plays for FK Dubnica in the 3. liga.

Club career

Spartak Myjava
He made his professional debut for Spartak Myjava against MŠK Žilina on 3 August 2014.

References

External links
 Spartak Myjava profile
 
 Eurofotbal profile
 Futbalnet profile
 MFK Dubnica profile

1996 births
Living people
Slovak footballers
Association football defenders
FK Dubnica players
Spartak Myjava players
FK Slovan Duslo Šaľa players
FC ViOn Zlaté Moravce players
Slovak Super Liga players